Dear Deidre was the British newspaper The Sun's long running agony aunt column written by Deidre Sanders. Dear Deidre is also a phone-in section on the long-running British daytime TV programme This Morning, where the section has viewers calling live on the show asking for help from Deidre Sanders.

June Deidre Sanders (born 9 June 1945), a graduate of Sheffield University, was responsible for the feature which bears her name since November 1980 until her retirement at the end of 2020. On 27 September 2022, Sanders announced during an interview with This Morning that she had been diagnosed with breast cancer.

References

External links 
 

British advice columnists
British women columnists